Fluor-uvite is a tourmaline mineral with the chemical formula CaMg3(Al5Mg)(Si6O18)(BO3)3(OH)3F. It is a rare mineral that is found in calcium rich contact metamorphic rocks with increased amounts of boron. Uvite is trigonal hexagonal, which means that it has three equal length axes at 120 degrees, all perpendicular to its fourth axis which has a different length. Uvite is part of the space group 3m. Uvite's hardness has been measured to be 7.5 on the Mohs hardness scale. The color of uvite widely varies, depending on the sample, but is mostly deep green or brown. In regard to uvite's optical properties, it is uniaxial (-) and anisotropic, meaning that the velocity of light in the mineral depends on the path that it takes. In plane polarized light, uvite is colorless to pale yellow and shows weak pleochroism.

Uvite was first found in 1929 in Uva Province, Sri Lanka, hence the name.

Uvite has no use, but is commonly found in mineral specimen collections. The mineral is sought after by collectors because of its pronounced colors, crystal structure, and often large crystal size.

References

Aluminium minerals
Calcium minerals
Cyclosilicates
Magnesium minerals
Trigonal minerals
Minerals in space group 160
Tourmalines